Interpay Nederland B.V. was the Dutch payment processor and payment product provider from 1994 to 2006. Interpay owned PIN, Chipknip,  and Incasso. In 2005, they spun off Currence and in 2006 they merged to form Equens.

History 

Interpay was founded as a merger between BeaNet, the Bankgirocentrale and Eurocard Nederland.

ING Group was the largest shareholder of Interpay, at around 30%.

In 1995, Interpay started with a pilot of the Chipknip.

Trouw noted in 2001 that a smooth transition to the Euro was dependent on Interpay. In 2003, Annemarie Jorritsma became a commissioner at Interpay. 

In September 2003, Interpay started together with Banksys and SSB the company Sinsys for credit cards, to reduce costs. Sinsys ultimately became wholly owned by SIA in 2012.

Director Willem Stolwijk left in 2006 and was replaced by Ben Haasdijk. In 2004, Interpay was forced to lower their tariffs for the hospitality sector. The Netherlands Competition Authority fined Interpay for 30 million euros because their tariffs were 5 to 7 times too high. In 2004, Interpay sold their Document Services division to Unisys.

In September 2006, it was merged with the German Transaktionsinstitut to form Equens.

Transaction processing 
In 2005, Interpay processed 3.3 billion financial transactions.

Subsidiaries 
Interpay had two subsidiaries, Paysquare who facilitatated the acceptance of credit cards and InterEGI who distributed the prepaid Chipknip.

References

External links 
 Interpay video

Defunct companies
Payment systems organizations
Financial services in the Netherlands
Banking organizations